Zając  is a village in the administrative district of Gmina Liw, within Węgrów County, Masovian Voivodeship, in east-central Poland.

Before the 1998 local boundary reforms it was administratively part of the Siedlce Voivodeship.

References

Villages in Węgrów County